The National Sports Council of Malaysia (NSC or MSN), is a government agency and statutory body under the Ministry of Youth and Sports of the Government of Malaysia which governs the sporting activities in Malaysia. It was established under National Sports Council of Malaysia Act 1971 and National Sports Council of Malaysia Act 1979 Amendment and launched by the second Prime Minister of Malaysia, Abdul Razak Hussein on 21 February 1972.

List of programmes
 Athletes Training Programme (Backup/Talent, Podium)
 Para Athletes Training Programme (Backup/Talent, Podium)
 National Football Development Programme
 National Hockey Development Programme
 National Rugby Development Programme
 Junior Cycling Malaysia
 Women in Sports

List of venues

Former venues
 Taman Keramat National Sports Council Complex - Handed over to SkySierra Development Sdn Bhd for the development of The Valley Residence Modern Housing Project.

Affiliated Federal Territories and State Sports Councils
Section 7 of the National Sports Council of Malaysia Act 1971 empowers the Government to establish Sports Councils in the Federal Territories and each state of Malaysia. While the Sports Councils of the Peninsular states are administered by the Secretary Office of the respective State Government, the Sabah and Sarawak State Sports Councils are administered by the Ministry of Youth and Sports of the respective state and the Federal Territories Sports Council is administered by the Department of Federal Territories.

Awards
 Anugerah Sukan Negara

References

External links
 

Sport in Malaysia
1972 establishments in Malaysia
Ministry of Youth and Sports (Malaysia)